Owensboro Community and Technical College (OCTC) is a public community college in Owensboro, Kentucky. It is part of the Kentucky Community and Technical College System (KCTCS). Owensboro Community College (est. 1986) and Owensboro Technical College (est. 1929) consolidated to become OCTC. OCTC is accredited by the Southern Association of Colleges and Schools (SACS) to offer technical as well as associate's degree programs.

Service area 

The primary service area of OCTC includes:

 Daviess County
 Hancock County
 Ohio County
 McLean County
 Spencer County (Indiana)

Campuses

OCTC maintains three campus locations (Main Campus, Downtown Campus, Southeastern Campus and a Hancock County Center in Lewisport, KY), all in Kentucky.
Main Campus is located at 4800 New Hartford Road Owensboro, KY 42303

External links
Official website

Kentucky Community and Technical College System
Buildings and structures in Owensboro, Kentucky
Educational institutions established in 2005
Universities and colleges accredited by the Southern Association of Colleges and Schools
Education in Daviess County, Kentucky
2005 establishments in Kentucky